Aygül  is a feminine Turkmen and Turkish given name and a surname.

Given name
 Aygül Berivan Aslan (born 1981), Kurdish-Austrian politician
 Aygul Idrisova (born 1995), Russian draughts player 
 Aygül Özkan (born 1971), German politician 

Turkish feminine given names